Ladislav Smoljak (9 December 1931 – 6 June 2010) was a Czech film and theater director, actor and screenwriter. He was born in Prague.

Smoljak tried to study at an art academy but failed the admission process. He went on to study physics and mathematics, and later worked as journalist and scriptwriter. Together with Zdeněk Svěrák he founded the Theater of Jára Cimrman (Divadlo Járy Cimrmana, DJC)  in Prague, named after a fictitious genius. Smoljak wrote scripts and directed several films; these became very successful in the Czech Republic.

He died of cancer on 6 June 2010 in Kladno.

Filmography

Screenplay 
 1974 Jáchyme, hoď ho do stroje! (with Zdeněk Svěrák and Oldřich Lipský)
 1976 Marečku, podejte mi pero! (with Zdeněk Svěrák)
 1976 Na samotě u lesa (with Zdeněk Svěrák)
 1978 Ball Lightning (with Zdeněk Svěrák and Zdeněk Podskalský)
 1980 Trhák (with Zdeněk Svěrák)
 1983 Jára Cimrman ležící, spící (with Zdeněk Svěrák)
 1984 Rozpuštěný a vypuštěný (with Zdeněk Svěrák)
 1987 Nejistá sezóna (with Zdeněk Svěrák)

Director
 1978 Ball Lightning (with Zdeněk Podskalský)
 1981 Vrchní, prchni!
 1983 Jára Cimrman ležící, spící
 1984 Rozpuštěný a vypuštěný
 1987 Nejistá sezóna
 1990 Tvrdý chleba – TV film
 1990 Motýl na anténě – TV film
 1992 Osvětová přednáška v Suché Vrbici – TV film
 1992 Ať ten kůň mlčí! – TV film
 1996 ''Dvě z policejní brašny – TV film

References

External links

Biography (in Czech)

1931 births
2010 deaths
Czech male stage actors
Czech male film actors
Czech male television actors
20th-century Czech dramatists and playwrights
Czech male dramatists and playwrights
Czech screenwriters
Male screenwriters
Czech theatre directors
Recipients of Medal of Merit (Czech Republic)
Deaths from cancer in the Czech Republic
Writers from Prague
Film directors from Prague
20th-century male writers
Burials at Olšany Cemetery